William Dawson (1704–1752) was an Anglican clergyman, poet and member of the Governor's Council of Virginia who became the second president of The College of William & Mary in Williamsburg, Virginia (1743-1752).

Early life and education
Dawson was born in Cumberland, England in 1704. He began studies at Queen's College of Oxford University when he was 15 years old, graduated with a M.A. in 1728, and was admitted as a fellow of the college in 1733 (by which time he was living in the Virginia colony). His younger brother Thomas Dawson (1715-1760) also emigrated to the colony to become rector of Bruton Parish in Williamburg by 1743, and would become the fourth president of William & Mary (1755–1760).

Career
Dawson was ordained in the Church of England before sailing to the Virginia Colony to become rector of the Jamestown Parish. He also taught moral philosophy at the College of William and Mary and succeeded Rev. James Blair as its President following Rev. Blair's death in 1742. Rev. Dawson also served as chaplain of the House of Burgesses during its sessions. Appointed as a member of the Governor's Council in 1745, Dawson continued to serve in what was in effect the upper house of the Virginia General Assembly until his death.

He published a 30-page book of poetry, Poems on Several Occasions by a Gentleman of Virginia, a copy of which George Washington owned.

Personal life
Dawson's first wife was Mary Stith, a member of the First Families of Virginia. Her grandfathers were John Stith and William Randolph. They had three children; one grandson became North Carolina planter and politician, and eventually Congressman William Johnston Dawson. Following her death, Rev. Dawson remarried, to the widow Elizabeth Churchill Bassett, whose first husband burgess William Bassett, had died leaving a considerable estate in New Kent County, Virginia, as well as a young son, Burgess Bassett Sr., whom Dawson helped raise. Thus, his step-grandson, Burgess Bassett Jr. would also become a Congressman, as well as serve in both houses of the Virginia General Assembly and on the vestry of historic Bruton Parish Church.

Legacy
Dawson died in 1752, and was succeeded by his Virginia-born brother-in-law, Rev. William Stith, who would only survive three years, and be succeeded by Rev. Dawson's brother Thomas. Some of William and Thomas Dawson's papers are held by the Library of Congress. A facsimile edition of his poetry book was published in 1931. Both Dawson brothers are collectively the namesakes for Dawson Hall in the Bryan Complex at William & Mary. The College also has a portrait formerly thought to be of Dawson.

References

1704 births
1752 deaths
18th-century American poets
18th-century American male writers
American male poets
18th-century American Episcopal priests
Alumni of The Queen's College, Oxford
College of William & Mary faculty
Presidents of the College of William & Mary
British North American Anglicans
Virginia Governor's Council members
18th-century American politicians
Anglican poets